Virginia High School may refer to:

 Virginia High School (Minnesota), United States
 Virginia High School (Virginia), United States

See also
 Virginia High School League, Virginia, United States